Thurman is an unincorporated rural hamlet in Washington County, Colorado, United States. It was originally a Mennonite settlement.  There are no businesses or services now located in Thurman, and only a couple of farm homes. Google Maps hasn't yet bothered to go there.

History
Thurman was established about 1902.  The Thurman Post Office opened in July 1904, but closed on August 10, 1924: the US Post Office at Anton (ZIP 80801) now serves Thurman. The town once boasted a population of over 150 people, but declined after a 1924 tornado killed ten people meeting at a home.  By the 1970s, the Mennonite population had relocated, along with their church building, to Joes, Colorado.

Geography
Thurman is located at  (39.590648,-103.210749). Thurman is located at the intersection along unpaved county roads County Roads 3 and CC, 9 miles south of Anton in southern Washington County, about 6 miles north of the Lincoln county line.

1924 Tornado
On Sunday August 10, 1924, storm clouds were building after an unusually hot day when the temperature reached 96 degrees Fahrenheit (35 degrees Celsius). Afternoon rains began and stopped at about 12:30. Suddenly things became quiet, but clouds turned a dark black color; at about 1:00 pm, two farmers in the town spotted a large 1/2 mile wide tornado about 3 miles west of there. The tornado traveled in a north-easterly direction. The tornado struck the town with full force and demolished almost every building in the small community. The tornado was thought to be an F4 to low end F5, with winds exceeding 210 mph, which killed 10 people. Making this the strongest and deadliest tornado in Colorado history. After the tornado, the population declined and many who survived moved to nearby towns and the post office closed. The cemetery is all that remains today.

See also
 List of cities and towns in Colorado

References

Unincorporated communities in Washington County, Colorado
Unincorporated communities in Colorado

vo:Thurman